4 Pics 1 Word is a word puzzle game created by LOTUM GmbH, available for free on Android and iOS.

Gameplay
4 Pics 1 Word's gameplay is very simple: each level displays four pictures linked by one word - the player's aim is to work out what the word is, from a set of letters given below the pictures. The game is said to follow the freemium model: although the game is free, microtransactions are available to help the user progress through the game more quickly.

Effect on cheating
The game is written from an English dialect perspective, as well as contains some unfamiliar words, causing some people to turn to cheating sites or apps to get the correct answers. According to psychology PhD Jamie Madigan, "people are more likely to cheat when they are anonymous and that they’ll cheat less the more they are connected to other gamers — the more, in other words, that they are known."

Reception
4 Pics 1 Word has received mostly positive reviews. PC Advisor gave the Android version 4/5, praising its entertainment value, but stating that the social aspect could be improved. Pocket-lint featured it as their "App of the Day" on the 25th February 2013, praising both its simplicity, and its social aspect. What Mobile also gave it 4/5, praising its simplicity and execution, whilst criticizing its frequency of highlighting the "hint" button.

There is also a German version of the game called 4 Bilder 1 Wort.

References

Word games
IOS games
Android (operating system) software
Word puzzle video games
2013 video games
Video games developed in Germany